The Stronger Love is a 1916 American drama silent film directed by Frank Lloyd, written by Julia Crawford Ivers, and starring Vivian Martin, Edward Peil, Sr., Frank Lloyd, Jack Livingston, Alice Knowland, and Herbert Standing. It was released on August 13, 1916, by Paramount Pictures.

Plot
Vivian Martin played Nell Serviss, a beautiful young girl from the mountains that was engaged to Jim Serviss, who is the leader of their clan. She meets a stranger at the Rutherford farm and falls in love. The stranger is in their mountains searching for radium in rocks. Someone lights the Serviss farm on fire and the stranger is falsely accused. Everyone is mad at the stranger (who at this point is revealed to be a Rutherford) but Nell says she wants to marry him so that no one will kill him. In the end, Nell chases after Jim to tell him that she lied and really wants to be with him.

Cast 
Vivian Martin as Nell Serviss
Edward Peil, Sr. as Jim Serviss
Frank Lloyd as Tom Serviss
Jack Livingston as Rolf Rutherford
Alice Knowland as Mrs. Jane Rutherford
Herbert Standing as Oriel Kincaid
John McKinnon as Peter Kincaid
Louise Emmons as Widow Serviss 
William Jefferson (actor)

Preservation status
The Stronger Love survives in an incomplete or in fragment form in the Library of Congress, Packard Campus for Audio-Visual Conservation.

References

External links

The AFI Catalog of Feature Films: The Stronger Love

1916 films
1910s English-language films
Silent American drama films
1916 drama films
Paramount Pictures films
Films directed by Frank Lloyd
American black-and-white films
American silent feature films
1910s American films